Odozana patagiata is a moth of the subfamily Arctiinae. It was described by Paul Dognin in 1909. It is found in Bolivia.

References

Lithosiini
Moths described in 1909